Burl Abron Toler Sr. (May 9, 1928 – August 16, 2009) was an American football official in the National Football League (NFL) for 25 seasons from 1965 to 1989. He served as a field judge and head linesman throughout his career and is most notable for being the first African-American official in the NFL. He also officiated in one Super Bowl, Super Bowl XIV in 1980, and wore the uniform number 37 for most of his career, except for the 1979–81 period, when officials were numbered by position. Toler wore number 18 for those three seasons.

On April 21, 2008 Toler Sr. was inducted into the Bay Area Sports Hall of Fame. Several years after his death, on May 9, 2017, the University of San Francisco renamed one of the campus's student dormitories in his honor.

College career
Toler was born in Memphis, Tennessee in 1928. He attended the University of San Francisco and was a linebacker. Despite his physical gifts and strapping size, Toler never even played a down of prep football at Manassas High School in his native Memphis, but quickly emerged as a dominant force once recruited to the Bay Area. While at City College of San Francisco, Toler teamed with future Dons teammate and NFL Hall-of-Famer Ollie Matson to lead the school to the “Mythical” Junior College National Championship in 1948. He was a member of the 1951 undefeated Dons football team of which three of his teammates would later be enshrined into the Pro Football Hall of Fame after successful careers in the NFL: Gino Marchetti, Ollie Matson, and Bob St. Clair. Toler earned his degree in science from USF in 1952 and added a Master’s in 1966.

Professional career

Professional playing career
Toler was a 9th round draft pick (number 105 overall) for the Cleveland Browns, but seriously injured his knee during a college all-star game that ended his football playing career, so he decided to become an official instead. After retiring as an NFL official in 1990, he served as a game observer for the league, which involved grading officials, for eight years.

Professional officiating career
Toler became the first African-American to serve as a field official in a major American professional sports league when he was appointed by the NFL as a head linesman prior to the 1965 season.

Toler was the head linesman for the 1982 AFC Championship Game between the San Diego Chargers and Cincinnati Bengals at Cincinnati's Riverfront Stadium. The game was played under the coldest wind chill temperature in NFL history. The game would later become known in NFL lore as the "Freezer Bowl". He also was the first black man to be an official in Super Bowl history.

After football

Educational career
Toler worked for 17 years at Benjamin Franklin Middle School in San Francisco as a teacher and as the district's first African American secondary school principal. The former Ben Franklin Middle School campus, now the home of two charter schools (Gateway High School and KIPP SF Bay Academy), was renamed in his honor on October 22, 2006.

Toler was also on the Board of Trustees of his Alma Mater the University of San Francisco from 1987 until 1998.

Personal life
Toler was married in 1952 and had six children with his wife Melvia. He has eight grandchildren and two brothers and one sister.

Toler along with Hall of Famer and Olympian Ollie Matson were initiated into the Kappa Alpha Psi fraternity (Gamma Alpha chapter) on April 17, 1950. He died in Castro Valley, California on August 16, 2009.

His grandson, Burl Toler III, is an American football wide receiver. He was signed by the San Jose Sabercats of the Arena Football League on October 17, 2006, and spent several months on NFL team rosters from 2006-2008.

References

External links
 "USF Legend of the Hilltop Burl Toler Passes Away at 81," University of San Francisco Athletics, Monday, August 17, 2009.
 FitzGerald, Tom. "Burl Toler, NFL's first black official, dies," San Francisco Chronicle, Tuesday, August 18, 2009.
 Weber, Bruce. "Burl Toler, First Black N.F.L. Official, Dies at 81," The New York Times, Friday, August 21, 2009.

1928 births
2009 deaths
American football linebackers
National Football League officials
San Francisco Dons football players
Players of American football from Memphis, Tennessee
African-American players of American football
African-American sports officials
20th-century African-American sportspeople
21st-century African-American people
Burials at Cypress Lawn Memorial Park